Ex parte James (1803) 32 ER 385 is an insolvency and company law case, concerning conflicts of interest, and the absolute duty to avoid them.

Facts
A bankrupt's estate was purchased by a solicitor to the commission of the bankrupt.

Judgment
Lord Eldon LC stated the following in his judgment.

See also
Regal (Hastings) Ltd v Gulliver [1942] 1 All ER 378
Holder v Holder [1968] Ch 353

Notes

References
TE Chan, 'Revisiting Ex Parte James' [2003] Singapore Journal of Legal Studies 557-582
Copy of Judgment in the English Reports 

United Kingdom company case law
United Kingdom insolvency case law
English trusts case law
Court of Chancery cases
1803 in British law
1803 in case law